Anathallis vitorinoi is a species of orchid plant native to Brazil.

References 

vitorinoi
Flora of Brazil